George H. Brown may refer to:

 George H. Brown (footballer) (1866–1903), English footballer, Notts County
 George H. Brown (North Carolina judge) (1850–1926), justice of the North Carolina Supreme Court
 George H. Brown (producer), British film producer
 George H. Brown (Lowell mayor) (1877–1950), mayor of Lowell, Massachusetts
 George H. Brown Jr. (Tennessee judge) (born 1939), justice of the Tennessee Supreme Court
 George Harold Brown (1908–1987), American developer of color television
 George Houston Brown (1810–1865), New Jersey politician

See also
 George Brown (athlete) (George Henry Brown Jr., 1931–2018), American long jumper
 George Brown (bishop of Liverpool) (George Hilary Brown, 1784–1856), English Roman Catholic Bishop of Liverpool
 George Brown (sailor) (George Herbert Brown, 1915–1995), British Olympic sailor
 George Brown (medievalist) (George Hardin Brown, fl. 1950s–2000s), American scholar of Anglo-Saxon literature
 Hank Brown (George Hanks Brown, born 1940), U.S. Senator from Colorado
 George Brown (disambiguation)
 George Browne (disambiguation)
 George Broun (disambiguation)